Harur is a state legislative assembly constituency in Dharmapuri district, Tamil Nadu, India, which includes the city of Harur. Its State Assembly Constituency number is 61. The seat is reserved for candidates from the Scheduled Castes. It is part of the Dharmapuri constituency for national elections to the Parliament of India. It is one of the 234 State Legislative Assembly Constituencies in Tamil Nadu, in India.

Madras State

Tamil Nadu

Election Results

2021

2019 By-election

2016

2011

2006

2001

1996

1991

1989

1984

1980

1977

1971

1967

1962

1957

1952

References 

 l

Assembly constituencies of Tamil Nadu
Dharmapuri district